La mujer prohibida is a Venezuelan telenovela created by Argentine writer Manuel Muñoz Rico and produced by Venevisión in 1972.

Ada Riera, Martín Lantigua and Humberto García starred as the protagonists with Amelia Roman as the main antagonist.

Cast
Ada Riera as Virginia Galvan
Martín Lantigua as Marcos Villena
Humberto García as Cristian Villena
Amelia Roman as La Waica
Jose Torres as Juancho
Haydée Balza as Yajaira
Jesús Maella as Hilario Galvan
Mary Soliani as Chimbela
Martha Lancaste as La Chepa
Concha Rosales as Pilar Martínez
Ingrid Gil as Lupita
Hector Cabrera as Padre Damasco
Norah Zurita as Gisela
Tito Bonilla as Yaco
Octavio Diaz as Augusto Casas
Heriberto Escalona as Eduardo Salinas

References

External links

 "La mujer prohibida"*(Venezuela, 1973)*

1972 telenovelas
Venevisión telenovelas
Spanish-language telenovelas
Venezuelan telenovelas
1972 Venezuelan television series debuts
1973 Venezuelan television series endings
Television shows set in Venezuela